Orz, orz, or ORZ may refer to:
 orz, a posture emoticon representing a kneeling, bowing, or comically fallen over person
 Orz, a race in the fictional Star Control universe
 Ormu language of Papua (ISO 639-3 code)
 Orange Walk Airport, Belize (IATA code)

See also
OCZ, a brand of solid-state drives